Friends of the Anson Air Museum is an Australian aviation museum located in Ballarat, Victoria. It is housed in the gym of the former Royal Australian Air Force base at what is now Ballarat Airport. It houses an Avro Anson aircraft currently under restoration and an exhibition on World War II and Australia's part in it.

References

External links
 Photo gallery

Aerospace museums in Australia
Military and war museums in Australia
Museums in Ballarat